Eurysthea koepckei is a species of beetle in the family Cerambycidae. It was described by Franz in 1956.

References

Elaphidiini
Beetles described in 1956